The governor of Zacatecas (Spanish: Gobernador Constitucional del Estado de Zacatecas) wields executive power in the State of Zacatecas. The governor is directly elected by the citizens, using secret ballot, to a six-year term with no possibility of reelection.

The current governor of Zacatecas is David Monreal Ávila, a member of the National Regeneration Movement (MORENA), since 2021.

Governors
 1928–1932: Leobardo C. Ruiz
 1932–1936: Matías Ramos, National Revolutionary Party, PNR
 1940–1940: Rodrigo Bañuelos Cosío (interim), PNR
 1940–1940: J. Félix Bañuelos, Party of the Mexican Revolution, PRM
 1940–1940: Pánfilo Natera García, PRM
 1940–1940: Gregorio Medina (interim), PRM
 1940–1940: Jesús Escobar González (interim), PRM
 1940–1941: Pánfilo Natera García, PRM
 1941–1941: Salvador Martínez (interim), PRM
 1941–1942: Pánfilo Natera García, PRM
 1942–1942: Jesús Escobar González (interim), PRM
 1942–1942: Pánfilo Natera García, PRM
 1942–1943: Pánfilo Natera García, PRM
 1943–1943: Jesús Escobar González (interim), PRM
 1943–1943: Víctor Gallegos (interim), PRM
 1943–1943: Salvador Castañedo (interim), PRM
 1943–1944: Pánfilo Natera García, PRM
 1944–1944: Jesús Escobar González (interim), PRM
 1944–1944: Salvador Castañedo (interim), PRM

 1944–1944: Jesús Hernández Olvera (interim), PRM
 1944–1944: Pánfilo Natera García, PRM
 1944–1950: Leobardo Reynoso, PRM
 1950–1956: José Minero Roque 
 1956–1962: Francisco E. García 
 1962–1968: José Rodríguez Elías 
 1968–1974: Pedro Ruiz González 
 1974–1980: Fernando Pámanes Escobedo 
 1980–1986: José Guadalupe Cervantes Corona 
 1986–1991: Genaro Borrego Estrada 
 1991–1992: Pedro de León (interim) 
 1992–1998: Arturo Romo Gutiérrez 
 1998–2004: Ricardo Monreal Ávila 
 2004–2010: Amalia García 
 2010–2016: Miguel Alonso Reyes 
 2016–2021: Alejandro Tello Cristerna 
 2021–2027: David Monreal Ávila

See also
List of Mexican state governors

References

Zacatecas